Pete Hershberger (born 4 June 1949 in Denver, Colorado)  is an American politician who served as a member of the Arizona House of Representatives, representing the 26th District from 2001 to 2008.

Education
Hershberger received his BS from Colorado College in 1971 and obtained his MEd. in Counseling and Guidance from the University of Arizona in 1977.

Personal life
Hershberger is single. He is an Episcopalian.

Organizations
Hershberger is a member of many prestigious organizations which include:
 Member/Board of Directors of the Rotary Club of Tucson from 1991–present
 Member of the Southwest Leadership Program for State and Local Government in 2001
 Director Pima County Representative, State Board of Directors for Community Colleges of Arizona from 1998–2001
 Member of Leadership Class, Greater Tucson Leadership in 2000

References

External links

 Arizona House of Representatives – Rep. Pete Hershberger official AZ House site
 Project Vote Smart – Representative Pete Hershberger (AZ) profile
 Follow the Money – Pete Hershberger
 2006 2004 2002 campaign contributions

Members of the Arizona House of Representatives
1949 births
Living people
Arizona Democrats
Arizona Republicans